Elsa Ebbesen (7 July 1890 – 21 December 1977) was a Swedish stage and film actress. A character actress she appeared in Swedish films and later television programmes over the course of several decades.

Selected filmography

 House Slaves (1923)
 Ulla, My Ulla (1930)
 Adventure (1936)
 Emilie Högquist (1939)
 The Crazy Family (1940)
 The Three of Us (1940)
 The Fight Continues (1941)
 Goransson's Boy (1941)
 Only a Woman (1941)
 Första divisionen (1941)
 Goransson's Boy (1941)
 Lucky Young Lady (1941)
 Katrina (1943)
 Prince Gustaf (1944)
 The People of Hemsö (1944)
 The Bells of the Old Town (1946)
 Crime in the Sun (1947)
 Dynamite (1947)
 How to Love (1947)
 The Quartet That Split Up (1950)
 Defiance (1952)
 Love (1952)
 Say It with Flowers (1952)
 Stupid Bom (1953)
 The Glass Mountain (1953)
 Storm Over Tjurö (1954)
 Sir Arne's Treasure (1954)
 Young Summer (1954)
 The Unicorn (1955)
 Egen ingång (1956)
Seventh Heaven (1956)
 Night Child (1956)
 The Minister of Uddarbo (1957)
 A Guest in His Own House (1957)
 The Jazz Boy (1958)
 Crime in Paradise (1959)
 Winter Light (1963)
 Morianna (1965)
 The Touch (1971)

References

Bibliography
 Paietta, Ann C. Teachers in the Movies: A Filmography of Depictions of Grade School, Preschool and Day Care Educators, 1890s to the Present. McFarland, 2007.
 Steene, Birgitta. Ingmar Bergman: A Reference Guide. Amsterdam University Press, 2005.

External links

1890 births
1977 deaths
Swedish film actresses
Swedish stage actresses
20th-century Swedish actresses